Sayyed Mīr Fathullāh Shīrāzī Namazi (died 15 August 1589) was a Persian Sufi polymath - an Islamic jurist, mechanical engineer, mathematician, astronomer, physician and philosopher—who worked for Akbar, ruler of the Mughal Empire. Shirazi was given the title of Azuddudaulah, translated as "the arm of the empire." Shirazi was one of the students of the philosopher Ghyath al-Din Mansur Dashtaki. Eventually Shirazi left his native home of Safavid Persia to serve at the Mughal court.

Biography
Fathullah Shirazi Namazi was a polymath who worked as an imperial finance minister for Akbar. According to Abu'l-Fazl ibn Mubarak's Akbarnama, when Shirazi died, Akbar mourned his death:

Inventions
Among the inventions credited to him was an early anti-infantry volley gun with multiple gun barrels similar to a hand cannon's.

Another cannon-related machine he created could clean sixteen gun barrels simultaneously, and was operated by a cow. He also developed a seventeen-barrelled cannon fired with a matchlock.

Not all of his creations were intended for warfare however; he designed a carriage praised by Abu'l-Fazl ibn Mubarak for its comfort. It could also be used to grind corn when not transporting passengers.

Bengali land taxes were initially collected according to the Hijri calendar which did not coincide with the solar agricultural cycles. In response, emperor Akbar asked Shirazi to create a new calendar by combining the Hijri and the native calendars. Referred to as the fôshôlī shôn (harvest calendar), Shirazi is credited as the formulator of the modern Bengali calendar.

He invented the gaj-i-ilahi system.

Notes

1589 deaths
16th-century Indian inventors
Firearm designers
16th-century Indian Muslims
Iranian inventors
16th-century Iranian philosophers
Islamic philosophers
People from Shiraz
Mughal Empire people